Elections for the Greater Geelong City Council are scheduled to take place on 27 October 2017.

Conducted by post, they are occurring separately to other local government elections in the state due to the 2016 sacking of the Council.

Background
The previous City of Greater Geelong Council, which was elected in 2012, and Mayor Darryn Lyons, elected in a Mayoral by-election in 2013, were sacked by the Daniel Andrews Government in May 2016 after allegations of bullying, and Administrators installed to manage city and council affairs in place of elected Councillors as well as to weed out cultural problems that led to the Council's sacking in the first place.

As such, Geelong missed out on electing a new Council in November 2016, when other local government areas in Victoria elected their Councils. Instead, a Citizen's Jury was established to help determine a way forward, including deciding on the structure a future Council should take.

Eventually, legislation was introduced and passed the Victorian Parliament to bring forward elections to October 2017 (instead of 2020, as originally planned).

Wards
Councillors will be elected to four multi-member wards. The wards and currently declared candidates are as follows:

Bellarine (3 councillors)

Brownbill (3 councillors)

Kardinia (3 councillors)

Windermere (2 councillors)

Election timeline

26 September 2017: 
Candidate nominations close

3 October: 
Windermere candidates forum at 94.7 The Pulse

10 October: 
Brownbill candidates forum at 94.7 The Pulse

10–12 October: 
Ballot packs are mailed out in the days around 10–12 October 2017.

27 October: 
Postal voting closes

28 October: 
Election Day

References

2017 elections in Australia
2010s in Victoria (Australia)
Elections in Victoria (Australia)
City of Greater Geelong
October 2017 events in Australia
Local elections in Australia